The 1998 Eastern Michigan Eagles football team represented Eastern Michigan University in the 1998 NCAA Division I-A football season. In their fourth season under head coach Rick Rasnick, the Eagles compiled a 3–8 record (3–6 against conference opponents), finished in fourth place in the West Division of the Mid-American Conference, and were outscored by their opponents, 309 to 216. The team's statistical leaders included Walter Church with 2,650 passing yards, Eric Powell with 473 rushing yards, and Jermaine Sheffield with 953 receiving yards. L. J. Shelton received the team's most valuable player award.

Schedule

References

Eastern Michigan
Eastern Michigan Eagles football seasons
Eastern Michigan Eagles football